The Regional Committee of Communists in Macedonia was the provincial communist organization in Vardar Macedonia from 1939 to 1943.

History 

At the beginning of 1939, the Central Committee of the Communist Party of Yugoslavia decided that Vardar Macedonia should form a regional committee. Svetozar Vukmanović was sent to Skopje in August of that year, and the local committee was organised under his leadership on 8 September. Blagoje Orlandić, another Serb, was chosen as secretary.

After organising a large demonstration in Skopje in December, Orlandić was arrested and sentenced to one year in prison. In February 1940, a new regional-committee leadership was elected at a meeting; Metodi Shatorov was elected secretary. In June, a national regional-committee program was drawn up. A September 8, 1940 conference was held near Skopje, at which a political resolution was drafted and new leadership was elected. Under Shatorov's leadership, the Macedonian regional committee followed Communist International (Comintern) policy and maintained close ties with Georgi Dimitrov.

After the Bulgarian  takeover of Vardarska Banovina in April 1941, the Macedonian communists fell into the Communist Party of Bulgaria's sphere of influence under Sharlo's leadership. When the directive to organise an armed resistance movement in all regions of occupied Yugoslavia was issued, Sharlo disobeyed the order. He told the Central Committee of the Communist Party of Yugoslavia (CPY) that the situation in Macedonia did not permit immediate military action; propaganda should precede the formation of military units. Sharlo refused to define the Bulgarian forces as occupiers (contrary to instructions from Belgrade), however, and called for the incorporation of the local Macedonian Communist organisations into the Bulgarian Communist Party (BCP). The Macedonian regional committee refused to remain in contact with the CPY, and joined the BCP. Sharlo refused to distribute a CPY proclamation calling for military action against Bulgarians.

Because of the conflict within the Macedonian CPY regional committee, there was no resistance movement in Vardar Macedonia. The Comintern supported a policy of non-intervention at the beginning of World War II, arguing that the war was an imperialist conflict between national ruling classes. When the Soviet Union was attacked by Nazi Germany, however, the Comintern issued a directive ordering the formation of communist resistance movements in all European fascist-occupied territories and the Macedonian regional committee (RC) began organizing resistance. The RC (headed by Shatorov) immediately ordered the formation of partisan units – the first of which was formed in the Skopje region on 22 August 1941 – and attacked Bulgarian guards on 8 September in Bogomila, near Skopje. With the help of the Comintern and Joseph Stalin, the Macedonian Communists were attached to the CPY. Soon after this, Shatorov lost his popularity in the CPY and was discredited. Consequently he moved to Sofia, where he began working as one of the Bulgarian resistance movement leaders.

CPY loyalists were next appointed as leaders of the RC, with Lazar Koliševski secretary; in September 1941, Koliševski was sent to Skopje. The new leadership began forming partisan detachments. Armed insurgents from the Prilep partisan detachment attacked Axis-occupied zones in Prilep, including a Bulgarian police station, on 11 October. This date is considered the symbolic beginning of the Macedonian resistance. In November, Koliševski was arrested and sentenced to death by a Bulgarian military court. He wrote two appeals for clemency (to the Bulgarian tsar and the defence minister), insisting on his Bulgarian origin. Koliševski's sentence was commuted to life imprisonment and he was imprisoned in Pleven, Bulgaria. The Prilep detachment was active until December, when it split into three groups: the first in Skopje, the second in Tikveš, and the third in Bitola.

Sharlo's leadership was terminated, but elements of his policy were preserved by some of the local communist activists. After the arrest of Lazar Koliševski, the new executive body of the Macedonian RC continued to share Shatorov's pro-Bulgarian ideas and re-established contact with the BCP. Bane Andreev of Veles, Macedonia's new party secretary, expressed this ideology. He thought that the Macedonian people believed in Bulgaria's role as liberator, and no Macedonian wanted to fight Bulgarian soldiers; Macedonians should answer the Bulgarian mobilisation call and join the Bulgarian army. Josip Broz Tito, however, disagreed. Bane Andreev was arrested by Bulgarian police in the spring of 1942, worsening the struggle between pro-Bulgarian and pro-Yugoslav factions; Cvetko Uzunovski created a provisional regional committee which attempted to take over the pro-Bulgarian faction, with little success.

Although several Macedonian partisan detachments were formed through the end of 1942 which fought Bulgarian, Italian, German and Albanian occupation forces (and despite Sofia's mismanaged administration), most Macedonian communists were not yet lured to Yugoslavia. Between 1941 and 1943, Tito sent five emissaries to Macedonia to persuade his poorly-disciplined comrades; their efforts had limited success, however, and the regional committee was under the de facto control of the BCP. At the beginning of 1943, the Montenegrin Svetozar Vukmanović ("Tempo") was sent as an assistant to Macedonian partisan headquarters to change that. Tempo tried to organize an energetic resistance and was tasked with setting up a Macedonian communist party within the Yugoslav party. Some of his objectives were to destroy the influence of the BCP in Macedonia and to fight any form of autonomism.

Vukmanović had to Macedonianize the struggle and give it a new ethnic-Macedonian facade. One of his main achievements was that wartime pro-Bulgarianism receded into the background of pro-Yugoslavism. He capitalised on the increasingly-contradictory attitudes of Bulgarian authorities, which adopted a policy of centralisation in 1942 (contradicting their initial agenda of respecting Macedonian autonomy). Yugoslav communists proclaimed as their aim the unification of Macedonia's three regions (Yugoslav, Greek and Bulgarian), attracting Macedonian nationalists. Tempo began to organise armed resistance to Bulgarian rule in earnest. Under Yugoslav pressure, the regional committee was dissolved and replaced by the Communist Party of Macedonia (KPM, part of the Yugoslav Communist Party). Formed on 19 March 1943 in the Albanian occupation zone in Tetovo, its first central committee was composed primarily of pro-Yugoslav communists. Yugoslav communists recognized a separate Macedonian nationality to stop the fears of the local population that they would continue the former Yugoslav policy of forced Serbianization. They didn't support the view that the Macedonian Slavs are Bulgarians, because that meant in practice, the area should remain part of the Bulgarian state after the war.

Leadership 
 Blažo Orlandić (September 1939 - March 1940)
 Metodi Shatorov (March 1940 - August 1941) 
 Lazar Koliševski (September 1941 - November 1941) 
 Bane Andreev (November 1941 - May 1942) 
 Cvetko Uzunovski (June–September 1942) 
 Kuzman Josifovski Pitu (September 1942 - March 1943)

See also
World War II in Yugoslav Macedonia

References 

Political parties established in 1939
Political parties disestablished in 1943
Politics of Yugoslavia
League of Communists of Yugoslavia
Bulgarian Communist Party